Norwegian County Road 680 is a road in the municipalities of Kristiansund and Aure in Møre og Romsdal county and Heim in Trøndelag county, Norway.

The route starts in Øygarden in Kristiansund, where it branches off from European route E70, and runs west to Seivika, from which there is a ferry to Tømmervåg on the island of Tustna. It then takes a meandering coastal route eastward through the municipality of Aure to Svanem in Trøndelag, where it turns south and runs through Kyrksæterøra before meeting European route E39 in Stormyra, just outside Vinjeøra.

Prior to January 1, 2010, the route was a Norwegian national road, but control and maintenance of the road was transferred to the counties from the national government on that date, and so now it is a Norwegian county road.

References

External links
Statens vegvesen – trafikkmeldinger Fv680 (Traffic Information: County Road 680)

680
680
Kristiansund
Aure, Norway
Heim, Norway